The 1989 Toronto Blue Jays season was the franchise's 13th season of Major League Baseball. It resulted in the Blue Jays finishing first in the American League East with a record of 89 wins and 73 losses. The Blue Jays' ace pitcher Dave Stieb led the staff with 17 victories, and the team was offensively buoyed by the league's home run king Fred McGriff. Toronto won the AL East pennant in the final weekend of the season against the favored Baltimore Orioles. The Blue Jays lost the ALCS in five games to the eventual World Series champion Oakland Athletics. It was the team's last season at Exhibition Stadium, before moving to SkyDome halfway into the season. The Blue Jays hit eight grand slams, the most in MLB in 1989.

Offseason
 October 9, 1988: Carlos Delgado was signed as an amateur free agent by the Blue Jays.
 December 6, 1988: Mauro Gozzo was drafted by the Toronto Blue Jays from the Kansas City Royals in the 1988 minor league draft.
 December 22, 1988: Cecil Fielder was purchased from the Blue Jays by the Hanshin Tigers (Japan Central).
 December 24, 1988: Mike Flanagan was signed as a free agent by the Blue Jays.
 January 18, 1989: Bob Brenly was signed as a free agent by the Blue Jays.
 March 9, 1989: DeWayne Buice was traded by the California Angels to the Toronto Blue Jays for Cliff Young.

Regular season
The regular season would represent a turning point for the Blue Jays in many different ways. The Blue Jays started the 1989 season in Kansas City against the Royals. Behind the pitching of Jimmy Key, the Jays won the first game of the season 4-3. The rest of the month would result in a losing record for the Jays. After the first month of the season, the Blue Jays had 10 wins and 20 losses and sat 6.5 games behind the Baltimore Orioles in the standings. The result was that Pat Gillick made his first trade in 605 days. On April 30, Gillick sent Jesse Barfield to the New York Yankees in exchange for Al Leiter. The reason for the deal was that management was convinced that Rob Ducey was ready to be an everyday outfielder. The spot eventually went to the surprising Junior Felix that year, and Ducey never became the everyday player the Jays imagined him to be.

The Blue Jays had never fired a manager in the middle of the season. After the Jays were swept by the Minnesota Twins in a three-game series, including a 13-1 loss in the final game of the series, the Jays had 12 wins and 24 losses. The Jays had also lost 15 of their last 19 games. Gillick decided that a change was needed. On Monday, May 15, Jimy Williams had become the first Jays manager to be fired in mid-season.  Williams would be replaced by Cito Gaston, the first black manager in the history of the franchise.

The Blue Jays' last game at Exhibition Stadium was against the first team they played there, the Chicago White Sox. From there, the Blue Jays opened the new Skydome with a loss to the Milwaukee Brewers. On September 30, they clinched the American League East division title at the new ballpark.

Notable games
 April 16, 1989 – Blue Jays third baseman Kelly Gruber hits for the cycle in a 15-8 victory over the Kansas City Royals.
 May 4, 1989 – In a game versus the California Angels, Junior Felix hits a home run in his first Major League at-bat, becoming only the 60th Major Leaguer to achieve the feat.
 May 28, 1989 – The Blue Jays play their final game at Exhibition Stadium, a 7-5 10-inning win over the Chicago White Sox. Coincidentally, the White Sox had been the Jays' opponents in their first game at Exhibition Stadium (also the first game in franchise history) twelve years before.
 June 4, 1989 – The Blue Jays stage a remarkable comeback in a game against the Red Sox in Boston. Trailing 10-0 after six innings, they slowly close the gap, finally taking an 11-10 lead on a ninth-inning grand slam by Ernie Whitt. Boston ties the score in the bottom half of the inning, but Junior Felix smokes a two-run home run in the top of the 12th inning, giving Toronto a 13-11 victory.
 June 5, 1989 – The Blue Jays play their first game in the brand-new SkyDome, a 5-3 loss to the Milwaukee Brewers.
 August 4, 1989 – With the Blue Jays leading the New York Yankees 2-0, Dave Stieb comes one out away from pitching a perfect game, but the Yankees' Roberto Kelly cracks a double into left field to break it up. Steve Sax then singles Kelly home to cut the lead to 2-1, but the Blue Jays ace holds on for the victory. It marks the third time in two seasons that Stieb has lost a no-hitter with two out in the ninth inning.
 September 30, 1989 – In the next-to-last game of the regular season (and the last edition of NBC Sports' Saturday afternoon Game of the Week before the series moved to CBS the following season), the Blue Jays clinch their second American League East division title. Tom Henke strikes out the Baltimore Orioles' Larry Sheets for the final out.

Opening Day starters
 Jesse Barfield
 George Bell
 Pat Borders
 Bob Brenly
 Kelly Gruber
 Jimmy Key
 Manuel Lee
 Nelson Liriano
 Fred McGriff
 Lloyd Moseby

Season standings

Record vs. opponents

Notable transactions
April 30, 1989: Jesse Barfield was traded by the Blue Jays to the New York Yankees for Al Leiter.
June 12, 1989: Dane Johnson was released by the Blue Jays.
July 31, 1989: Jeff Musselman and Mike Brady (minors) were traded by the Blue Jays to the New York Mets for Mookie Wilson.
July 31, 1989: Lee Mazzilli was selected off waivers by the Blue Jays from the New York Mets.
August 24, 1989: Tony Castillo and Francisco Cabrera were traded by the Blue Jays to the Atlanta Braves for Jim Acker.
August 26, 1989: Paul Spoljaric was signed by the Blue Jays as an amateur free agent.

Draft picks
June 5, 1989: John Olerud was drafted by the Blue Jays in the 3rd round of the 1989 amateur draft. Player signed August 26, 1989.
June 5, 1989: Aaron Small was drafted by the Toronto Blue Jays in the 22nd round of the 1989 amateur draft. Player signed June 8, 1989.

Roster

Game log

|- align="center" bgcolor="bbffbb"
| 1 || April 3 || @ Royals || 4 – 3 || Key (1-0) || Gubicza (0-1) || Henke (1) || 38,595 || 1-0
|- align="center" bgcolor="ffbbbb"
| 2 || April 5 || @ Royals || 2 – 1 || Gordon (1-0) || Stottlemyre (0-1) || || 17,126 || 1-1
|- align="center" bgcolor="ffbbbb"
| 3 || April 6 || @ Royals || 3 – 2 || Montgomery (1-0) || Ward (0-1) || Farr (1) || 18,883 || 1-2
|- align="center" bgcolor="bbffbb"
| 4 || April 7 || @ Rangers || 10 – 9 || Castillo (1-0) || Guante (1-1) || Henke (2) || 22,914 || 2-2
|- align="center" bgcolor="ffbbbb"
| 5 || April 8 || @ Rangers || 5 – 4 || Moyer (1-0) || Key (1-1) || Russell (2) || 26,073 || 2-3
|- align="center" bgcolor="ffbbbb"
| 6 || April 9 || @ Rangers || 3 – 2 || Rogers (1-0) || Henke (0-1) || || 19,498 || 2-4
|- align="center" bgcolor="bbffbb"
| 7 || April 10 || @ Yankees || 8 – 0 || Stieb (1-0) || Hawkins (0-2) || || 17,192 || 3-4
|- align="center" bgcolor="bbffbb"
| 8 || April 11 || @ Yankees || 11 – 6 (10) || Henke (1-1) || Righetti (0-1) || || 20,277 || 4-4
|- align="center" bgcolor="ffbbbb"
| 9 || April 12 || @ Yankees || 5 – 3 || Candelaria (1-1) || Castillo (1-1) || Guetterman (1) || 17,900 || 4-5
|- align="center" bgcolor="bbffbb"
| 10 || April 14 || Royals || 3 – 0 || Key (2-1) || Leibrandt (0-1) || || 46,028 || 5-5
|- align="center" bgcolor="ffbbbb"
| 11 || April 15 || Royals || 10 – 5 || Aquino (2-0) || Ward (0-2) || || 25,247 || 5-6
|- align="center" bgcolor="bbffbb"
| 12 || April 16 || Royals || 15 – 8 || Wells (1-0) || Saberhagen (1-1) || Castillo (1) || 35,210 || 6-6
|- align="center" bgcolor="ffbbbb"
| 13 || April 17 || Yankees || 7 – 2 || Hawkins (1-2) || Flanagan (0-1) || || 23,260 || 6-7
|- align="center" bgcolor="ffbbbb"
| 14 || April 18 || Yankees || 2 – 0 || LaPoint (1-1) || Musselman (0-1) || Righetti (1) || 25,040 || 6-8
|- align="center" bgcolor="ffbbbb"
| 15 || April 19 || Yankees || 4 – 2 || Candelaria (2-1) || Key (2-2) || Guetterman (3) || 26,471 || 6-9
|- align="center" bgcolor="bbffbb"
| 16 || April 21 || Rangers || 6 – 3 || Stieb (2-0) || Brown (1-1) || Ward (1) || 22,186 || 7-9
|- align="center" bgcolor="bbffbb"
| 17 || April 22 || Rangers || 4 – 2 || Ward (1-2) || Hough (2-1) || || 27,278 || 8-9
|- align="center" bgcolor="ffbbbb"
| 18 || April 23 || Rangers || 4 – 1 || Ryan (2-1) || Stottlemyre (0-2) || || 31,473 || 8-10
|- align="center" bgcolor="ffbbbb"
| 19 || April 24 || @ Athletics || 5 – 4 || Nelson (2-1) || Henke (1-2) || || 25,099 || 8-11
|- align="center" bgcolor="ffbbbb"
| 20 || April 25 || @ Athletics || 3 – 1 || Davis (2-1) || Cerutti (0-1) || Eckersley (7) || 12,437 || 8-12
|- align="center" bgcolor="ffbbbb"
| 21 || April 26 || @ Mariners || 7 – 6 || Trout (2-1) || Wells (1-1) || Jackson (1) || 7,399 || 8-13
|- align="center" bgcolor="bbffbb"
| 22 || April 27 || @ Mariners || 6 – 1 || Flanagan (1-1) || Dunne (0-1) || || 8,600 || 9-13
|- align="center" bgcolor="ffbbbb"
| 23 || April 28 || @ Angels || 9 – 0 || McCaskill (4-1) || Stottlemyre (0-3) || || 30,958 || 9-14
|- align="center" bgcolor="ffbbbb"
| 24 || April 29 || @ Angels || 4 – 3 (10) || Minton (1-0) || Ward (1-3) || || 49,906 || 9-15
|- align="center" bgcolor="ffbbbb"
| 25 || April 30 || @ Angels || 1 – 0 (11) || McClure (1-0) || Henke (1-3) || || 31,125 || 9-16
|-

|- align="center" bgcolor="ffbbbb"
| 26 || May 2 || Athletics || 8 – 5 || Honeycutt (1-0) || Ward (1-4) || Plunk (1) || 23,439 || 9-17
|- align="center" bgcolor="bbffbb"
| 27 || May 3 || Athletics || 2 – 0 || Flanagan (2-1) || Moore (3-2) || || 22,370 || 10-17
|- align="center" bgcolor="ffbbbb"
| 28 || May 4 || Angels || 3 – 2 (10) || Harvey (1-0) || Ward (1-5) || Minton (3) || 21,188 || 10-18
|- align="center" bgcolor="ffbbbb"
| 29 || May 5 || Angels || 5 – 3 || Abbott (2-2) || Cerutti (0-2) || Harvey (5) || 24,188 || 10-19
|- align="center" bgcolor="ffbbbb"
| 30 || May 6 || Angels || 5 – 4 || McClure (2-0) || Ward (1-6) || || 39,123 || 10-20
|- align="center" bgcolor="bbbbbb"
| -- || May 7 || Angels || colspan=6|Postponed (rain) Rescheduled for July 17
|- align="center" bgcolor="bbffbb"
| 31 || May 8 || Mariners || 10 – 1 || Stieb (3-0) || Dunne (1-2) || || 23,293 || 11-20
|- align="center" bgcolor="ffbbbb"
| 32 || May 9 || Mariners || 4 – 3 || Hanson (4-2) || Flanagan (2-2) || Schooler (7) || 24,234 || 12-20
|- align="center" bgcolor="bbffbb"
| 33 || May 10 || Mariners || 3 – 2 || Key (3-2) || Langston (4-4) || || 33,216 || 12-21
|- align="center" bgcolor="ffbbbb"
| 34 || May 12 || @ Twins || 6 – 5 || Berenguer (1-0) || Wells (1-2) || Reardon (6) || 24,073 || 12-22
|- align="center" bgcolor="ffbbbb"
| 35 || May 13 || @ Twins || 10 – 8 || Rawley (3-4) || Stieb (3-1) || Reardon (7) || 29,712 || 12-23
|- align="center" bgcolor="ffbbbb"
| 36 || May 14 || @ Twins || 13 – 1 || Viola (2-5) || Flanagan (2-3) || || 33,980 || 12-24
|- align="center" bgcolor="bbffbb"
| 37 || May 15 || Indians || 5 – 3 || Key (4-2) || Farrell (2-3) || || 22,330 || 13-24
|- align="center" bgcolor="bbffbb"
| 38 || May 16 || Indians || 7 – 6 || Henke (2-3) || Atherton (0-2) || Ward (2) || 23,214 || 14-24
|- align="center" bgcolor="ffbbbb"
| 39 || May 17 || Indians || 6 – 3 || Black (2-5) || Stieb (3-2) || Jones (7) || 24,406 || 14-25
|- align="center" bgcolor="bbffbb"
| 40 || May 19 || @ White Sox || 9 – 3 || Flanagan (3-3) || King (4-4) || || 11,282 || 15-25
|- align="center" bgcolor="bbffbb"
| 41 || May 20 || @ White Sox || 11 – 1 || Key (5-2) || Hillegas (1-5) || || 18,029 || 16-25
|- align="center" bgcolor="bbffbb"
| 42 || May 21 || @ White Sox || 9 – 3 || Cerutti (1-2) || Pérez (2-5) || Ward (3) || 16,488 || 17-25
|- align="center" bgcolor="ffbbbb"
| 43 || May 22 || Twins || 6 – 2 || Anderson (5-2) || Stieb (3-3) || || 40,134 || 17-26
|- align="center" bgcolor="bbffbb"
| 44 || May 23 || Twins || 2 – 1 || Wells (2-2) || Berenguer (2-2) || || 24,443 || 18-26
|- align="center" bgcolor="ffbbbb"
| 45 || May 24 || Twins || 10 – 4 || Viola (3-6) || Flanagan (3-4) || || 27,138 || 18-27
|- align="center" bgcolor="bbffbb"
| 46 || May 26 || White Sox || 11 – 3 || Key (6-2) || Hillegas (1-6) || || 30,105 || 19-27
|- align="center" bgcolor="ffbbbb"
| 47 || May 27 || White Sox || 5 – 3 || Pérez (3-5) || Cerutti (1-3) || Thigpen (7) || 37,437 || 19-28
|- align="center" bgcolor="bbffbb"
| 48 || May 28 || White Sox || 7 – 5 (10) || Henke (3-3) || Thigpen (0-1) || || 46,120 || 20-28
|- align="center" bgcolor="ffbbbb"
| 49 || May 29 || @ Indians || 5 – 3 || Candiotti (6-2) || Flanagan (3-5) || Jones (10) || 19,947 || 20-29
|- align="center" bgcolor="ffbbbb"
| 50 || May 30 || @ Indians || 6 – 2 || Farrell (3-5) || Sanchez (0-1) || || 6,204 || 20-30
|- align="center" bgcolor="ffbbbb"
| 51 || May 31 || @ Indians || 7 – 4 || Black (4-6) || Key (6-3) || Jones (11) || 12,890 || 20-31
|-

|- align="center" bgcolor="bbffbb"
| 52 || June 2 || @ Red Sox || 7 – 2 || Cerutti (2-3) || Dopson (5-4) || Ward (4) || 33,584 || 21-31
|- align="center" bgcolor="bbffbb"
| 53 || June 3 || @ Red Sox || 10 – 2 || Stieb (4-3) || Boddicker (3-5) || || 33,942 || 22-31
|- align="center" bgcolor="bbffbb"
| 54 || June 4 || @ Red Sox || 13 – 11 (12) || Ward (2-6) || Lamp (0-1) || || 33,760 || 23-31
|- align="center" bgcolor="ffbbbb"
| 55 || June 5 || Brewers || 5 – 3 || August (5-6) || Key (6-4) || Plesac (13) || 48,378 || 23-32
|- align="center" bgcolor="ffbbbb"
| 56 || June 6 || Brewers || 6 – 4 || Aldrich (1-0) || Ward (2-7) || Crim (3) || 45,520 || 23-33
|- align="center" bgcolor="bbffbb"
| 57 || June 7 || Brewers || 4 – 2 || Cerutti (3-3) || Bosio (6-4) || || 45,372 || 24-33
|- align="center" bgcolor="bbffbb"
| 58 || June 9 || Tigers || 2 – 0 || Stieb (5-3) || Tanana (5-6) || Wells (1) || 48,219 || 25-33
|- align="center" bgcolor="ffbbbb"
| 59 || June 10 || Tigers || 11 – 8 || Williams (3-2) || Key (6-5) || || 48,430 || 25-34
|- align="center" bgcolor="bbffbb"
| 60 || June 11 || Tigers || 4 – 0 || Flanagan (4-5) || Schwabe (1-1) || Ward (5) || 48,274 || 26-34
|- align="center" bgcolor="bbffbb"
| 61 || June 12 || Tigers || 5 – 4 (11) || Henke (4-3) || Gibson (2-4) || || 48,531 || 27-34
|- align="center" bgcolor="bbffbb"
| 62 || June 13 || @ Brewers || 4 – 3 || Ward (3-7) || Plesac (2-3) || || 15,469 || 28-34
|- align="center" bgcolor="bbffbb"
| 63 || June 14 || @ Brewers || 6 – 1 || Stieb (6-3) || Krueger (2-1) || || 14,808 || 29-34
|- align="center" bgcolor="ffbbbb"
| 64 || June 15 || @ Brewers || 6 – 4 || Fossas (1-0) || Key (6-6) || Plesac (15) || 16,964 || 29-35
|- align="center" bgcolor="bbffbb"
| 65 || June 16 || Mariners || 4 – 3 || Henke (5-3) || Schooler (1-1) || || 48,363 || 30-35
|- align="center" bgcolor="bbffbb"
| 66 || June 17 || Mariners || 3 – 2 || Ward (4-7) || Jackson (2-1) || || 48,336 || 31-35
|- align="center" bgcolor="ffbbbb"
| 67 || June 18 || Mariners || 8 – 2 || Bankhead (4-4) || Wills (0-1) || || 48,329 || 31-36
|- align="center" bgcolor="bbffbb"
| 68 || June 19 || @ Angels || 8 – 1 || Stieb (7-3) || Finley (7-6) || || 24,430 || 32-36
|- align="center" bgcolor="bbffbb"
| 69 || June 20 || @ Angels || 6 – 2 || Key (7-6) || McCaskill (7-4) || || 23,956 || 33-36
|- align="center" bgcolor="bbffbb"
| 70 || June 21 || @ Angels || 6 – 1 (14) || Henke (6-3) || Minton (1-2) || || 24,259 || 34-36
|- align="center" bgcolor="bbffbb"
| 71 || June 22 || @ Athletics || 4 – 2 (13) || Hernandez (1-0) || Corsi (0-1) || Wells (2) || 21,418 || 35-36
|- align="center" bgcolor="bbffbb"
| 72 || June 23 || @ Athletics || 10 – 8 || Buice (1-0) || Young (2-8) || Henke (3) || 27,795 || 36-36
|- align="center" bgcolor="ffbbbb"
| 73 || June 24 || @ Athletics || 7 – 1 || Stewart (12-3) || Stieb (7-4) || || 39,659 || 36-37
|- align="center" bgcolor="ffbbbb"
| 74 || June 25 || @ Athletics || 6 – 3 || Davis (6-3) || Key (7-7) || Honeycutt (8) || 49,219 || 36-38
|- align="center" bgcolor="ffbbbb"
| 75 || June 27 || @ Orioles || 16 – 6 || Tibbs (5-0) || Flanagan (4-6) || || 30,136 || 36-39
|- align="center" bgcolor="ffbbbb"
| 76 || June 28 || @ Orioles || 2 – 1 || Hickey (2-2) || Cerutti (3-4) || Olson (12) || 35,757 || 36-40
|- align="center" bgcolor="bbffbb"
| 77 || June 29 || @ Orioles || 11 – 1 || Cummings (1-0) || Schmidt (7-7) || || 39,528 || 37-40
|- align="center" bgcolor="ffbbbb"
| 78 || June 30 || Red Sox || 3 – 1 || Boddicker (5-7) || Wells (2-3) || Murphy (3) || 48,429 || 37-41
|-

|- align="center" bgcolor="ffbbbb"
| 79 || July 1 || Red Sox || 3 – 1 || Hetzel (1-0) || Stottlemyre (0-4) || Smith (10) || 48,639 || 37-42
|- align="center" bgcolor="ffbbbb"
| 80 || July 2 || Red Sox || 4 – 1 (11) || Murphy (1-3) || Wells (2-4) || Smith (11) || 48,516 || 37-43
|- align="center" bgcolor="bbffbb"
| 81 || July 3 || Red Sox || 3 – 2 || Cerutti (4-4) || Smithson (4-7) || Ward (6) || 48,483 || 38-43
|- align="center" bgcolor="ffbbbb"
| 82 || July 4 || Orioles || 8 – 0 || Schmidt (8-7) || Stieb (7-5) || Williamson (7) || 44,025 || 38-44
|- align="center" bgcolor="ffbbbb"
| 83 || July 5 || Orioles || 5 – 4 || Milacki (5-8) || Key (7-8) || Olson (13) || 49,239 || 38-45
|- align="center" bgcolor="bbffbb"
| 84 || July 6 || Orioles || 4 – 1 || Stottlemyre (1-4) || Ballard (10-4) || Ward (7) || 46,629 || 39-45
|- align="center" bgcolor="bbffbb"
| 85 || July 7 || @ Tigers || 6 – 4 || Cummings (2-0) || Hernández (2-2) || Henke (4) || 25,213 || 40-45
|- align="center" bgcolor="bbffbb"
| 86 || July 8 || @ Tigers || 8 – 3 || Cerutti (5-4) || Alexander (4-9) || Ward (8) || 31,342 || 41-45
|- align="center" bgcolor="bbffbb"
| 87 || July 9 || @ Tigers || 2 – 0 || Stieb (8-5) || Tanana (7-9) || Henke (5) || 32,428 || 42-45
|- align="center" bgcolor="ffbbbb"
| 88 || July 13 || Athletics || 11 – 7 || Burns (5-2) || Key (7-9) || || 48,207 || 42-46
|- align="center" bgcolor="bbffbb"
| 89 || July 14 || Athletics || 4 – 1 || Stieb (9-5) || Welch (10-5) || Ward (9) || 48,325 || 43-46
|- align="center" bgcolor="bbffbb"
| 90 || July 15 || Athletics || 6 – 1 || Flanagan (5-6) || Stewart (13-5) || || 48,238 || 44-46
|- align="center" bgcolor="ffbbbb"
| 91 || July 16 || Athletics || 6 – 2 || Moore (12-5) || Cerutti (5-5) || Burns (7) || 48,405 || 44-47
|- align="center" bgcolor="bbffbb"
| 92 || July 17 || Angels || 6 – 4 || Wells (3-4) || Abbott (8-6) || Henke (6) || || 45-47
|- align="center" bgcolor="bbffbb"
| 93 || July 17 || Angels || 5 – 4 || Wells (4-4) || McClure (2-1) || Henke (7) || 48,641 || 46-47
|- align="center" bgcolor="ffbbbb"
| 94 || July 18 || Angels || 1 – 0 || Blyleven (10-2) || Key (7-10) || || 48,717 || 46-48
|- align="center" bgcolor="ffbbbb"
| 95 || July 20 || @ Mariners || 5 – 2 || Bankhead (10-4) || Stieb (9-6) || Powell (2) || 15,723 || 46-49
|- align="center" bgcolor="bbffbb"
| 96 || July 21 || @ Mariners || 8 – 1 || Flanagan (6-6) || Harris (1-3) || || 17,591 || 47-49
|- align="center" bgcolor="bbffbb"
| 97 || July 22 || @ Mariners || 7 – 1 || Cerutti (6-5) || Dunne (1-5) || Ward (10) || 22,044 || 48-49
|- align="center" bgcolor="ffbbbb"
| 98 || July 23 || @ Mariners || 5 – 2 || Johnson (4-2) || Key (7-11) || || 17,973 || 48-50
|- align="center" bgcolor="bbffbb"
| 99 || July 24 || @ Rangers || 6 – 3 || Stottlemyre (2-4) || Álvarez (0-1) || Henke (8) || 33,754 || 49-50
|- align="center" bgcolor="bbffbb"
| 100 || July 25 || @ Rangers || 4 – 0 || Stieb (10-6) || Ryan (11-6) || Ward (11) || 25,297 || 50-50
|- align="center" bgcolor="ffbbbb"
| 101 || July 26 || @ Rangers || 11 – 1 || Brown (9-6) || Flanagan (6-7) || || 16,633 || 50-51
|- align="center" bgcolor="bbffbb"
| 102 || July 28 || @ Yankees || 6 – 2 || Cerutti (7-5) || LaPoint (6-9) || || 37,222 || 51-51
|- align="center" bgcolor="ffbbbb"
| 103 || July 29 || @ Yankees || 7 – 2 || Cary (1-0) || Key (7-12) || || 42,179 || 51-52
|- align="center" bgcolor="ffbbbb"
| 104 || July 30 || @ Yankees || 7 – 6 || Guetterman (3-5) || Ward (4-8) || || 45,107 || 51-53
|- align="center" bgcolor="bbffbb"
| 105 || July 31 || @ Yankees || 6 – 5 || Wells (5-4) || Hawkins (12-10) || Henke (9) || 21,019 || 52-53
|-

|- align="center" bgcolor="ffbbbb"
| 106 || August 1 || Royals || 2 – 1 || Saberhagen (11-5) || Stottlemyre (2-5) || || 48,528 || 52-54
|- align="center" bgcolor="bbffbb"
| 107 || August 2 || Royals || 8 – 0 || Cerutti (8-5) || Gubicza (9-9) || || 48,765 || 53-54
|- align="center" bgcolor="ffbbbb"
| 108 || August 3 || Royals || 5 – 0 || Gordon (12-4) || Key (7-13) || || 48,731 || 53-55
|- align="center" bgcolor="bbffbb"
| 109 || August 4 || Yankees || 2 – 1 || Stieb (11-6) || Parker (3-2) || || 48,789 || 54-55
|- align="center" bgcolor="ffbbbb"
| 110 || August 5 || Yankees || 5 – 4 || Hawkins (13-10) || Ward (4-9) || Righetti (18) || 49,155 || 54-56
|- align="center" bgcolor="bbffbb"
| 111 || August 6 || Yankees || 6 – 5 || Stottlemyre (3-5) || Terrell (0-2) || || 49,025 || 55-56
|- align="center" bgcolor="bbffbb"
| 112 || August 7 || Rangers || 2 – 1 || Cerutti (9-5) || Jeffcoat (5-5) || || 48,773 || 56-56
|- align="center" bgcolor="bbffbb"
| 113 || August 8 || Rangers || 7 – 0 || Gozzo (1-0) || Witt (9-10) || || 48,689 || 57-56
|- align="center" bgcolor="ffbbbb"
| 114 || August 9 || Rangers || 4 – 3 || Hough (7-11) || Stieb (11-7) || Russell (24) || 48,962 || 57-57
|- align="center" bgcolor="ffbbbb"
| 115 || August 11 || @ Royals || 6 – 2 || Saberhagen (13-5) || Flanagan (6-8) || || 40,027 || 57-58
|- align="center" bgcolor="bbffbb"
| 116 || August 12 || @ Royals || 2 – 0 || Stottlemyre (4-5) || Gubicza (10-10) || Henke (10) || 40,934 || 58-58
|- align="center" bgcolor="ffbbbb"
| 117 || August 13 || @ Royals || 8 – 3 || Gordon (14-4) || Cerutti (9-6) || || 33,619 || 58-59
|- align="center" bgcolor="bbffbb"
| 118 || August 14 || @ Red Sox || 4 – 2 || Gozzo (2-0) || Boddicker (10-9) || Henke (11) || 35,058 || 59-59
|- align="center" bgcolor="bbffbb"
| 119 || August 15 || @ Red Sox || 7 – 2 || Stieb (12-7) || Smithson (6-11) || Ward (12) || 34,800 || 60-59
|- align="center" bgcolor="bbffbb"
| 120 || August 16 || @ Red Sox || 7 – 3 || Wells (6-4) || Murphy (3-6) || Henke (12) || 35,310 || 61-59
|- align="center" bgcolor="ffbbbb"
| 121 || August 17 || @ Orioles || 11 – 6 || Ballard (12-6) || Cerutti (9-7) || || 40,147 || 61-60
|- align="center" bgcolor="bbffbb"
| 122 || August 18 || @ Orioles || 9 – 2 || Gozzo (3-0) || Johnson (2-2) || || 31,668 || 62-60
|- align="center" bgcolor="bbffbb"
| 123 || August 19 || @ Orioles || 5 – 1 || Key (8-13) || Milacki (7-11) || || 38,111 || 63-60
|- align="center" bgcolor="ffbbbb"
| 124 || August 20 || @ Orioles || 7 – 2 || Harnisch (3-6) || Stieb (12-8) || Thurmond (4) || 37,242 || 63-61
|- align="center" bgcolor="bbffbb"
| 125 || August 22 || Tigers || 3 – 2 (14) || Gozzo (4-0) || Núñez (2-3) || || 49,072 || 64-61
|- align="center" bgcolor="bbffbb"
| 126 || August 23 || Tigers || 11 – 4 || Wills (1-1) || Robinson (3-3) || || 49,233 || 65-61
|- align="center" bgcolor="bbffbb"
| 127 || August 24 || Tigers || 11 – 3 || Flanagan (7-8) || Morris (3-11) || || 49,201 || 66-61
|- align="center" bgcolor="bbffbb"
| 128 || August 25 || Brewers || 3 – 1 || Key (9-13) || Peterek (0-1) || Henke (13) || 49,457 || 67-61
|- align="center" bgcolor="bbffbb"
| 129 || August 26 || Brewers || 7 – 0 || Stieb (13-8) || Higuera (9-5) || || 49,507 || 68-61
|- align="center" bgcolor="bbffbb"
| 130 || August 27 || Brewers || 5 – 4 || Stottlemyre (5-5) || Bosio (14-9) || Ward (13) || 49,507 || 69-61
|- align="center" bgcolor="ffbbbb"
| 131 || August 28 || Brewers || 8 – 2 || Filer (5-2) || Cerutti (9-8) || Krueger (3) || 49,219 || 69-62
|- align="center" bgcolor="bbffbb"
| 132 || August 29 || White Sox || 3 – 2 || Flanagan (8-8) || Pall (4-5) || Henke (14) || 49,565 || 70-62
|- align="center" bgcolor="bbffbb"
| 133 || August 30 || White Sox || 2 – 1 || Key (10-13) || Dotson (4-8) || Ward (14) || 49,435 || 71-62
|- align="center" bgcolor="bbffbb"
| 134 || August 31 || White Sox || 5 – 1 || Stieb (14-8) || Rosenberg (4-10) || || 49,422 || 72-62
|-

|- align="center" bgcolor="bbffbb"
| 135 || September 1 || Twins || 7 – 3 || Stottlemyre (6-5) || Guthrie (1-1) || || 49,350 || 73-62
|- align="center" bgcolor="bbffbb"
| 136 || September 2 || Twins || 4 – 2 || Cerutti (10-8) || Smith (10-5) || Henke (15) || 49,291 || 74-62
|- align="center" bgcolor="ffbbbb"
| 137 || September 3 || Twins || 9 – 4 || Aguilera (1-3) || Flanagan (8-9) || || 49,073 || 74-63
|- align="center" bgcolor="bbffbb"
| 138 || September 4 || @ White Sox || 5 – 2 || Key (11-13) || Dotson (4-9) || Henke (16) || 9,318 || 75-63
|- align="center" bgcolor="bbffbb"
| 139 || September 5 || @ White Sox || 6 – 1 || Stieb (15-8) || Rosenberg (4-11) || || 7,858 || 76-63
|- align="center" bgcolor="bbffbb"
| 140 || September 6 || @ White Sox || 4 – 2 || Stottlemyre (7-5) || King (7-9) || Ward (15) || 7,350 || 77-63
|- align="center" bgcolor="bbffbb"
| 141 || September 7 || @ Indians || 12 – 4 || Cerutti (11-8) || Candiotti (12-8) || || 6,098 || 78-63
|- align="center" bgcolor="ffbbbb"
| 142 || September 8 || @ Indians || 5 – 4 || Jones (7-8) || Acker (0-1) || || 13,489 || 78-64
|- align="center" bgcolor="bbffbb"
| 143 || September 9 || @ Indians || 7 – 5 (16) || Wills (2-1) || Kaiser (0-1) || || 15,154 || 79-64
|- align="center" bgcolor="bbffbb"
| 144 || September 10 || @ Indians || 5 – 4 (10) || Acker (1-1) || Olin (1-2) || || 12,045 || 80-64
|- align="center" bgcolor="ffbbbb"
| 145 || September 12 || @ Twins || 8 – 2 || West (3-1) || Stottlemyre (7-6) || || 14,849 || 80-65
|- align="center" bgcolor="ffbbbb"
| 146 || September 13 || @ Twins || 3 – 2 || Tapani (2-0) || Cerutti (11-9) || Reardon (29) || 14,903 || 80-66
|- align="center" bgcolor="ffbbbb"
| 147 || September 14 || @ Twins || 2 – 0 || Guthrie (2-1) || Flanagan (8-10) || Reardon (30) || 14,262 || 80-67
|- align="center" bgcolor="bbffbb"
| 148 || September 15 || Indians || 5 – 2 || Key (12-13) || Swindell (13-5) || Henke (17) || 49,444 || 81-67
|- align="center" bgcolor="bbffbb"
| 149 || September 16 || Indians || 3 – 2 (11) || Wells (7-4) || Jones (7-9) || || 49,218 || 82-67
|- align="center" bgcolor="bbffbb"
| 150 || September 17 || Indians || 2 – 1 (10) || Acker (2-1) || Bailes (4-9) || || 49,501 || 83-67
|- align="center" bgcolor="ffbbbb"
| 151 || September 18 || Red Sox || 6 – 3 || Boddicker (13-11) || Cerutti (11-10) || Murphy (8) || 49,579 || 83-68
|- align="center" bgcolor="bbffbb"
| 152 || September 19 || Red Sox || 6 – 5 (13) || Henke (7-3) || Harris (2-2) || || 49,352 || 84-68
|- align="center" bgcolor="ffbbbb"
| 153 || September 20 || Red Sox || 10 – 3 || Clemens (16-10) || Key (12-14) || || 49,571 || 84-69
|- align="center" bgcolor="bbffbb"
| 154 || September 22 || @ Brewers || 7 – 3 || Stieb (16-8) || Reuss (9-8) || || 15,569 || 85-69
|- align="center" bgcolor="ffbbbb"
| 155 || September 23 || @ Brewers || 4 – 1 || August (12-11) || Stottlemyre (7-7) || Plesac (32) || 24,640 || 85-70
|- align="center" bgcolor="ffbbbb"
| 156 || September 24 || @ Brewers || 8 – 3 || Filer (7-3) || Cerutti (11-11) || Crim (7) || 17,485 || 85-71
|- align="center" bgcolor="bbffbb"
| 157 || September 25 || @ Tigers || 2 – 0 || Key (13-14) || Dubois (0-4) || Henke (18) || 15,990 || 86-71
|- align="center" bgcolor="ffbbbb"
| 158 || September 26 || @ Tigers || 4 – 3 || Henneman (11-4) || Ward (4-10) || || 16,185 || 86-72
|- align="center" bgcolor="bbffbb"
| 159 || September 27 || @ Tigers || 8 – 1 || Stieb (17-8) || Alexander (6-18) || Henke (19) || 18,331 || 87-72
|- align="center" bgcolor="bbffbb"
| 160 || September 29 || Orioles || 2 – 1 (11) || Henke (8-3) || Williamson (10-4) || || 49,636 || 88-72
|- align="center" bgcolor="bbffbb"
| 161 || September 30 || Orioles || 4 – 3 || Wills (3-1) || Williamson (10-5) || Henke (20) || 49,553 || 89-72
|-

|- align="center" bgcolor="ffbbbb"
| 162 || October 1 || Orioles || 7 – 5 || McDonald (1-0) || Gozzo (4-1) || || 49,469 || 89-73
|-

|- align="center" bgcolor="ffbbbb"
| 1 || October 3 || @ Athletics || 7 – 3 || Stewart (1-0) || Stieb (0-1) ||  || 49,435 || 0-1
|- align="center" bgcolor="ffbbbb"
| 2 || October 4 || @ Athletics || 6 – 3 || Moore (1-0) || Stottlemyre (0-1) || Eckersley (1) || 49,444  || 0-2
|- align="center" bgcolor="bbffbb"
| 3 || October 6 || Athletics || 7 – 3 || Key (1-0) || Davis (0-1) ||  || 50,268 || 1-2
|- align="center" bgcolor="ffbbbb"
| 4 || October 7 || Athletics || 6 – 5 || Welch (1-0) || Flanagan (0-1) || Eckersley (2) || 50,076 || 1-3
|- align="center" bgcolor="ffbbbb"
| 5 || October 8 || Athletics || 4 – 3 || Stewart (2-0) || Stieb (0-2) || Eckersley (3) || 50,024 || 1-4
|-

Player stats

Batting

Starters by position
Note: Pos = Position; G = Games played; AB = At bats; H = Hits; Avg. = Batting average; HR = Home runs; RBI = Runs batted in

Other batters
Note: G = Games played; AB = At bats; H = Hits; Avg. = Batting average; HR = Home runs; RBI = Runs batted in

Pitching

Starting pitchers
Note: G = Games pitched; IP = Innings pitched; W = Wins; L = Losses; ERA = Earned run average; SO = Strikeouts

Other pitchers
Note: G = Games pitched; IP = Innings pitched; W = Wins; L = Losses; ERA = Earned run average; SO = Strikeouts

Relief pitchers
Note: G = Games pitched; W = Wins; L = Losses; SV = Saves; ERA = Earned run average; SO = Strikeouts

ALCS

Game 1
October 3, 1989, at Oakland–Alameda County Coliseum

Game 2
October 4, 1989, at Oakland–Alameda County Coliseum

Game 3
October 6, 1989, at SkyDome

Game 4
October 7, 1989, at SkyDome

Game 5
October 8, 1989, at SkyDome

Award winners
 George Bell, Player of the Month Award, August
 Tony Fernández, Gold Glove Award
 Fred McGriff, Player of the Month Award, April
 Fred McGriff, American League Leader in Home Runs (36)
 Fred McGriff, Silver Slugger Award

All-Star Game
 Kelly Gruber, third base
 Tony Fernandez, shortstop

Farm system

References

External links
1989 Toronto Blue Jays at Baseball Reference
1989 Toronto Blue Jays at Baseball Almanac

Toronto Blue Jays seasons
Toronto Blue Jays season
American League East champion seasons
Toronto
Toronto Blue Jays